Raphale Mondale Evans (born 7 May 1990) is an English footballer. He previously played in the Football League for Rochdale. Evans has also played non-League football for Bradford Park Avenue, Leigh Genesis, Northwich Victoria, Salford City and most recently for Woodley Sports.

In 2009, he was jailed for violent disorder which effectively ended his playing career.

Life and career
Evans was born in Manchester. Described as "physically robust and commanding in the air", he began his football career in Rochdale's youth system. After captaining the youth team and playing for the reserves, he made his first-team debut at the end of the 2007–08 season, playing the whole of a 1–1 draw at home to Shrewsbury Town on 3 May 2008. He signed a 12-month professional contract before the 2008–09 season, and in October 2008 joined Bradford Park Avenue on a month's loan to gain experience; he made three starts and one substitute appearance. In March 2009, with limited opportunity for first-team football with Rochdale, he joined Leigh Genesis for a month's loan, but played only once for the club. His contract with Rochdale expired at the end of the season and was not renewed. 

In April 2009 Evans and four other men were remanded in custody charged with murder and attempted murder in connection with the fatal stabbing of a Manchester nightclub doorman. The accused men all denied the charges. Evans pleaded guilty to the lesser charge of violent disorder and was sentenced to 18 months imprisonment in October.

Evans resumed his football career in January 2011 with Northern Premier League Premier Division club Northwich Victoria, initially on non-contract terms. He signed a new contract with the club for the 2011–12 season. In October 2011 he joined Salford City, and in February 2012 he moved to Woodley Sports.

Evans signed a new full-time contract with Woodley Sports, renamed to Stockport Sports in July 2012.

References

External links
 

1990 births
Living people
Footballers from Manchester
English footballers
Association football defenders
Rochdale A.F.C. players
Bradford (Park Avenue) A.F.C. players
Leigh Genesis F.C. players
Northwich Victoria F.C. players
English Football League players
Salford City F.C. players
Stockport Sports F.C. players
New Mills A.F.C. players
Sportspeople convicted of crimes
Criminals from Manchester
Prisoners and detainees of England and Wales